The 2020 Cincinnati Reds season was the 151st season for the franchise in Major League Baseball, and their 18th at Great American Ball Park in Cincinnati. They made the playoffs as the number 7 seed in the National League, but were swept in two games by the Atlanta Braves in the 2020 National League Wild Card Series. The Braves held the Reds scoreless for all 22 innings in the series, an MLB postseason record.

On March 12, 2020, MLB announced that because of the ongoing COVID-19 pandemic, the start of the regular season would be delayed by at least two weeks in addition to the remainder of spring training being cancelled. Four days later, it was announced that the start of the season would be pushed back indefinitely due to the recommendation made by the CDC to restrict events of more than 50 people for eight weeks. On June 23, commissioner Rob Manfred unilaterally implemented a 60-game season. Players reported to training camps on July 1 in order to resume spring training and prepare for a July 24 Opening Day.

The shortened season led to the Reds recording the lowest number of hits (390) by a team in the modern era (since 1901). Their batting average of .212 was the lowest in MLB since the 1910 Chicago White Sox hit .211.

Offseason

Coaching Staff
October 24, 2019: Named Alan Zinter hitting coach. Zinter was previously the Assistant Director of Player Development, Offense, for the San Francisco Giants the past two seasons.
December 17, 2019: Named Joe Mather assistant hitting coach. Mather was previously the Minor League Field and Hitting Coordinator for the Arizona Diamondbacks.

Signings
December 2, 2019: Signed free agent Mike Moustakas to a four-year, $64 million contract. Moustakas played second and third base for the Milwaukee Brewers in 2019 and is expected to play second base for the Reds.
December 16, 2019: Signed free agent starting pitcher Wade Miley to a two-year, $15 million contract.
January 6, 2020: Signed Japanese outfielder Shogo Akiyama to a three-year, $21 million contract. Akiyama will be the first Japanese-born player to play for the Reds.
January 10, 2020: Agreed to one-year contracts with the following players, avoiding arbitration: starting pitcher Trevor Bauer, $17.5 million; reliever/outfielder Michael Lorenzen, $3.725 million; reliever Matt Bowman, $865,000; catcher Curt Casali, $1.4625 million; starting pitcher Anthony DeSclafani, $5.9 million.
January 27, 2020: Signed free agent Nicholas Castellanos to a four-year, $64 million contract.
January 30, 2020: Signed free agent reliever Pedro Strop to a one-year, $1.825 million contract.

Standings

National League Central

National League Wildcard

Record vs. opponents

Game log

Regular season

|-style="background:#cfc
|1|| July 24 || Tigers || 7–1 || Gray (1–0) || Boyd (0–1) || — || 1–0 || W1
|-style="background:#fbb
|2||July 25 || Tigers || 4–6 || Farmer (1–0) || Iglesias (0–1) || Jiménez (1) || 1–1 || L1
|-style="background:#fbb
|3||July 26 || Tigers || 2–3 || Cisnero (1–0) || Lorenzen (0–1) || Jiménez (2) || 1–2 || L2
|-style="background:#fbb
|4||July 27 || Cubs  || 7–8 || Lester (1–0) || Miley (0–1) || Jeffress (1) || 1–3 || L3
|-style="background:#fbb
|5||July 28 || Cubs  || 5–8 || Mills (1–0) || Reed (0–1) || — || 1–4 || L4
|-style="background:#cfc
|6||July 29 || Cubs  || 12–7 || Gray (2–0) || Hendricks (1–1) || — || 2–4 || W1
|-style="background:#bbb
|—||July 30 || Cubs  || colspan=7| Postponed (inclement weather). Rescheduled to August 29. 
|-style="background:#fbb
|7|| July 31 || @ Tigers || 2–7 || Turnbull (1–0) || Castillo (0–1) || — || 2–5 || L1
|-

|-style="background:#bbb
|—||August 1 || @ Tigers || colspan="7" | Postponed (inclement weather). Rescheduled to August 2.
|-style="background:#cfc
|8|| August 2 || @ Tigers   || 4–3  || Iglesias (1–0) || Jiménez (0–1) || — || 3–5 || W1
|-style="background:#cfc
|9|| August 2 || @ Tigers  || 4–0  || Bauer (1–0) || Norris (0–1) || — || 4–5 || W2
|-style="background:#cfc
|10||August 3 || Indians || 3–2 || Gray (3–0) || Plesac (0–1) || Iglesias (1) || 5–5 || W3
|-style="background:#fbb
|11||August 4 || Indians || 2–4 || Bieber (3–0) || Jones (0–1) || Hand (3) || 5–6 || L1
|-style="background:#fbb
|12||August 5 || @ Indians || 0–2 || Clevinger (1–1) || Antone (0–1) || Hand (4) || 5–7 || L2
|-style="background:#fbb
|13||August 6 || @ Indians || 0–13 || Carrasco (2–1) || Castillo (0–2) || — || 5–8 || L3
|-style="background:#cfc
|14||August 7|| @ Brewers || 8–3 || Bauer (2–0) || Lauer (0–1) || — || 6–8 || W1 
|-style="background:#cfc
|15||August 8|| @ Brewers || 4–1 || DeSclafani (1–0) || Anderson (0–1) || Iglesias (2) || 7–8 || W2 
|-style="background:#fbb
|16||August 9|| @ Brewers || 3–9 || Suter (2–0) || Gray (3–1) || — || 7–9 || L1 
|-style="background:#cfc
|17||August 11|| Royals || 6–5  || Sims (1–0) || Staumont (0–1) ||— || 8–9 || W1
|-style="background:#fbb
|18||August 12|| Royals || 4–5 || Keller (2–0) || Miley (0–2) || Rosenthal (4) || 8–10 || L1
|-style="background:#fbb
|19||August 13|| Pirates || 6–9 || Williams (1–3) || DeSclafani (1–1) || — || 8–11 || L2
|-style="background:#cfc
|20||August 14|| Pirates || 8–1 || Gray (4–1) || Kuhl (0–1) || — || 9–11 || W1 
|-style="background:#bbb
|—||August 15|| Pirates || colspan="7" | Postponed (COVID-19). Rescheduled to September 4.
|-style="background:#bbb
|—||August 16|| Pirates || colspan="7" | Postponed (COVID-19). Rescheduled to September 14.
|-style="background:#bbb
|—||August 18|| @ Royals || colspan="7" | Postponed (COVID-19). Rescheduled to August 19.
|-style="background:#fbb
|21||August 19|| @ Royals  || 0–4  || Keller (3–0) || Castillo (0–3) || Rosenthal (6) || 9–12 || L1
|-style="background:#cfc
|22||August 19|| @ Royals  || 5–0  || Bauer (3–0) || Harvey (0–1) || — || 10–12 || W1
|-style="background:#fbb
|23||August 20|| @ Cardinals || 4–5 || Elledge (1–0) || Iglesias (1–2) || — || 10–13 || L1
|-style="background:#cfc
|24||August 21|| @ Cardinals || 4–2 || Lorenzen (1–1) || Cabrera (1–1) || Iglesias (3) || 11–13 || W1
|-style="background:#fbb
|25||August 22|| @ Cardinals || 0–3 || Kim (1–0) || Miley (0–3) || Gallegos (1) || 11–14 || L1
|-style="background:#fbb
|26||August 23|| @ Cardinals || 2–6 || Cabrera (2–1) || Mahle (0–1) || – || 11–15 || L2
|-style="background:#fbb
|27||August 24||  @ Brewers || 2–4 || Anderson (2–2) || Bauer (3–1) || Hader (6) || 11–16 || L3
|-style="background:#fbb
|28||August 25|| @ Brewers || 2–3 || Woodruff (2–2) || Castillo (0–4) || Hader (7) || 11–17 || L4
|-style="background:#bbb
|—||August 26 || @ Brewers || colspan=7 | Postponed (Boycotts due to Jacob Blake shooting). Rescheduled to August 27.
|-style="background:#cfc
|29||August 27|| @ Brewers  || 6–1  || Gray (5–1) || Houser (1–3) || — || 12–17 || W1 
|-style="background:#cfc
|30||August 27|| @ Brewers  || 6–0  || Sims (2–0) || Lindblom (1–2) || — || 13–17 || W2
|-style="background:#cfc
|31||August 28|| Cubs  || 6–5 || Mahle (1–1) || Hendricks (3–4) || Iglesias (4) || 14–17 || W3
|-style="background:#fbb
|32||August 29|| Cubs  || 0–3  || Darvish (6–1) || Bauer (3–2) || Jeffress (4) || 14–18 || L1
|-style="background:#cfc
|33||August 29|| Cubs  || 6–5  || Kuhnel (1–0) || Kimbrel (0–1) ||  || 15–18 || W1
|-style="background:#fbb
|34||August 30|| Cubs || 1–10 || Rea (1–0) || Castillo (0–5) || — || 15–19 || L1 
|-style="background:#fbb
|35||August 31|| Cardinals || 5–7 || Hudson (1–2) || DeSclafani (1–2) || Gallegos (2) || 15–20 || L2 
|-

|-style="background:#fbb
|36||September 1 || Cardinals || 2–16 || Kim (2–0) || Gray (5–2) || — || 15–21 || L3
|-style="background:#cfc
|37||September 2 || Cardinals || 4–3 || Iglesias (2–2) || Gallegos (1–1) || — || 16–21 || W1
|-style="background:#cfc
|38||September 4|| @ Pirates  || 4–2  || Castillo (1–5) || Brault (0–2) || Iglesias (5) || 17–21 || W2 
|-style="background:#fbb
|39||September 4|| Pirates  || 3–4  || Howard (2–1) || Bauer (3–3) ||Rodríguez (3) || 17–22 || L1
|-style="background:#cfc
|40||September 5|| @ Pirates || 6–2 || Garrett (1–0) || Williams (1–6) || — || 18–22 || W1
|-style="background:#fbb
|41||September 6|| @ Pirates || 2–3 || Rodríguez (1–2) || Iglesias (2–3) || — || 18–23 || L1
|-style="background:#fbb
|42||September 8|| @ Cubs  || 0–3 || Mills (4–3) || Mahle (1–2) || Jeffress (6) || 18–24 || L2
|-style="background:#cfc
|43||September 9|| @ Cubs  || 3–0 || Bauer (4–3) || Darvish (7–2) || Iglesias (6) || 19–24 || W1
|-style="background:#fbb
|44||September 10|| @ Cubs  || 5–8 || Ryan (1-0) || Gray (5–3) || Jeffress (7) || 19–25 || L1
|-style="background:#cfc
|45||September 11 || @ Cardinals || 3–1 || Castillo (2–5) || Wainwright (4–1) || — || 20–25 || W1
|-style="background:#fbb
|46||September 12|| @ Cardinals || 1–7 || Hudson (3–2) || Antone (0–2) || — || 20–26 || L1  
|-style="background:#cfc
|47||September 13|| @ Cardinals || 10–5 || Bradley (2–0) || Gant (0–3) || Iglesias (7) || 21–26 || W1
|-style="background:#cfc
|48||September 14|| Pirates  || 3–1  || Iglesias (3–3) || Howard (2–2) || — || 22–26 || W2
|-style="background:#cfc
|49||September 14|| Pirates  || 9–4  || Romano (1–0) || Turley (0–2) || — || 23–26 || W3
|-style="background:#cfc
|50||September 15|| Pirates || 4–1 || Lorenzen (2–1) || Musgrove (0–5) || Garrett (1) || 24–26 || W4
|-style="background:#cfc
|51||September 16|| Pirates || 1–0 || Castillo (3–5) || Brubaker (1–2) || Iglesias (8) || 25–26 || W5
|-style="background:#cfc
|52||September 18|| White Sox || 7–1 || Mahle (2–2) || Stiever (0–1) || — || 26–26 || W6
|-style="background:#fbb
|53||September 19|| White Sox || 0–5 || Foster (5–0) || Bauer (4–4) || — || 26–27 || L1
|-style="background:#cfc
|54||September 20|| White Sox || 7–3 || Sims (3–0) || Cease (5–3) || — || 27–27 || W1
|-style="background:#cfc
|55||September 21|| Brewers || 6–3 || Castillo (4–5) || Woodruff (2–5) || — || 28–27 || W2
|-style="background:#fbb
|56||September 22|| Brewers || 2–3 || Anderson (4–3) || Antone (0–3) || Hader (11) || 28–28 || L1
|-style="background:#cfc
|57||September 23|| Brewers || 6–1 || Bauer (5–4) || Houser (1–6) || — || 29–28 || W1
|-style="background:#cfc
|58||September 25|| @ Twins || 7–2 || Lorenzen (3–1) || Berríos (5–4) || — || 30–28 || W2
|-style="background:#fbb
|59||September 26|| @ Twins || 3–7 || Clippard (2–1) || Castillo (4–6) || — || 30–29 || L1
|-style="background:#cfc
|60||September 27|| @ Twins || 5–3  || Iglesias (4–3) || Romo (1–3) || — || 31–29 || W1
|-

|- style="text-align:center;"
| Legend:       = Win       = Loss       = PostponementBold = Reds team member

Postseason 

|- style="background:#fbb;"
| 1 || September 30 || @ Braves || 0–1  || Minter (1–0) || Bradley (0–1) || — || 0–1 || L1
|- style="background:#fbb;"
| 2 || October 1 || @ Braves || 0–5 || Anderson (1–0) || Castillo (0–2) || — || 0–2 || L2
|-

Postseason rosters

| style="text-align:left" |
Pitchers: 21 Michael Lorenzen 22 Wade Miley 23 Archie Bradley 26 Raisel Iglesias 27 Trevor Bauer 30 Tyler Mahle 39 Lucas Sims 50 Amir Garrett 54 Sonny Gray 55 Robert Stephenson 58 Luis Castillo 70 Tejay Antone
Catchers: 12 Curt Casali 16 Tucker Barnhart 
Infielders: 3 Freddy Galvis 7 Eugenio Suárez 9 Mike Moustakas 19 Joey Votto 38 José García 52 Kyle Farmer 64 Matt Davidson
Outfielders: 2 Nicholas Castellanos 4 Shogo Akiyama 15 Nick Senzel 17 Brian Goodwin 31 Travis Jankowski 44 Aristides Aquino 
Designated hitters: 33 Jesse Winker 
|- valign="top"

Roster

Farm system

References

External links
 Official Website 
2020 Cincinnati Reds season at Baseball Reference

2020
2020 Major League Baseball season
2020 in sports in Ohio